Goodsprings is an unincorporated community in Walker County, Alabama, United States. Its ZIP code is 35560.

Notable person
 Claude Perry, offensive tackle for the Green Bay Packers from 1927 to 1935

Notes

Unincorporated communities in Walker County, Alabama
Unincorporated communities in Alabama